PSW-159 is a Constituency of the Provincial Assembly of Sindh.

See also

 Sindh

References

External links 
 Official Website of Government of Sindh

Constituencies of Sindh